The Wayside Folk Museum was a small private museum situated in the village of Zennor in west Cornwall, United Kingdom.

The exhibition within the museum concentrates on the past lives, traditions and practices of the people of Zennor and Penwith.  Displays includes the kitchen and parlour of a miller's cottage, a mill house, a blacksmith shop, exhibits on fishing, farming, mining, domestic life and archaeology.

References

External links
 Wayside Museum and Trewey Mill - Cornwall Museums

Cornish culture
Museums in Cornwall
Local museums in Cornwall
Blacksmith shops
Zennor